Idiopappus is a genus of flowering plant in the family Asteraceae. It contains the species Idiopappus quitensis and Idiopappus saloyensis.

References

 
Asteraceae genera
Taxonomy articles created by Polbot